The Housemaid is a 2016 Vietnamese gothic romance horror film directed by Derek Nguyen and starring Nhung Kate, Jean-Michel Richaud, Kim Xuan, and Rosie Fellner. Released in Vietnam on September 16, 2016, the film became the third-highest-grossing horror film in Vietnam's history and had its North American premiere at the 2017 Los Angeles Film Festival.

Plot
Set in 1953 Vietnam during the First Indochinese War, the film tells the story of an orphaned country girl named Linh, who gets hired to be a housemaid at a haunted French rubber plantation. She unexpectedly falls in love with the French landowner Captain Sebastien Laurent, and awakens the vengeful ghost of his dead wife, Camille... who is out for blood.

Cast
 Nhung Kate as Linh
 Jean-Michel Richaud as Captain Sebastien Laurent
 Kim Xuan as Mrs. Han
 Rosie Fellner as Madeleine
 Phi Phung as Mrs. Ngo
 Kien An as Mr. Chau
 Svitlana Kovalenko as Madame Camille
 Linh Son Nguyen as Bao

Release
The film was released in Vietnam on September 16, 2016. Since then, the film has sold to 18 different territories including Australia (JBG Pictures), Turkey (Medyavizyon), Peru (Delta Films), Malaysia (Suraya Filem), and the UK (Eureka Entertainment). IFC Films released the film theatrically and on video on demand on February 16, 2018 in North America via their horror label IFC Midnight.

Reception

Critical reception
The review aggregator website Rotten Tomatoes reported that 69% of critics have given the film a positive review based on 13 reviews, with an average rating of 5.79/10. On Metacritic, the film has a weighted average score of 61 out of 100 based on 4 critics, indicating "generally favorable reviews".

Awards
At the 2017 Los Angeles Film Festival, Nhung Kate received a Special Jury Prize for Acting for her portrayal of Linh.

The film was honored with the Silver Lotus Award (second prize) at the 2017 Vietnamese Film Festival and received awards for Best Score and Best Sound Design.

Remake
CJ E&M Film Division is producing and financing an American remake of the film, with a screenplay to be written by Oscar-winning screenwriter Geoffrey S. Fletcher.

References

External links
 
 Film review at Culture Crypt
 Interview with writer/director Nguyen in Asia Life Magazine

2016 films
Vietnamese supernatural horror films
2016 horror films